USS Midnight is the name of two ships in the service of the United States Navy.

 , a Union ship purchased in 1861 for use in the naval blockade of the South.
 , a concrete barge that would be renamed Trefoil and serve from 1944 until 1948.

See also
 Midnight (disambiguation)#Ships for other ships

United States Navy ship names